Tynnyrilaki is a 445-meter-high (1,460 ft) mountain 120 km E. of Kiruna, Sweden.
It's the highest point of an area called Pingisvaara.
This mountain marks one of the locations for the Struve Geodetic Arc.

Mountains of Norrbotten County